Charles Greville (2 November 1762 – 26 August 1832) was a British politician and public official.

Greville was the fifth child and fourth son of Fulke Greville and his wife, Frances (née Macartney). His parents lived at Wilbury House, Newton Tony, Wiltshire. He was educated at Westminster School. From 1778 to 1796, he was an officer in various Regiments of Foot.

On 31 March 1793, he married Lady Charlotte Cavendish-Bentinck, the third child and first daughter of William Cavendish-Bentinck, 3rd Duke of Portland. They had four children:
Harriet Catherine Greville, who married Francis Egerton, 1st Earl of Ellesmere
Charles Greville, diarist
Algernon Frederick Greville, Private Secretary to the Duke of Wellington
Henry William Greville, Private Secretary to Lord Francis Egerton

He served as the Member of Parliament for Petersfield from 1795 to 1796. He was Under-Secretary of State for Home Affairs from March 1796 to March 1798; Comptroller of Cash at the Excise Office from1799-d; Receiver-General Taxes, for Nottinghamshire; Naval Officer for Demerara and Essequibo from 1798; and Secretary, Registrar and Clerk of Council for Tobago from 1801.

He died on 26 August 1832, aged 69, in Hanover Square, London.

References

1762 births
1832 deaths
People educated at Westminster School, London
People from Wiltshire
British MPs 1790–1796
39th Regiment of Foot officers
45th Regiment of Foot officers
58th Regiment of Foot officers
90th Regiment of Foot officers